The 1970 NBA draft was the 24th annual draft of the National Basketball Association (NBA). The draft was held on March 23, 1970, before the 1970–71 season. In this draft, 17 NBA teams took turns selecting amateur U.S. college basketball players and other eligible players, including international players. A player who had finished his four-year college eligibility was eligible for selection. If a player left college early, he would not be eligible for selection until his college class graduated. The first two picks in the draft belonged to the teams that finished last in each division, with the order determined by a coin flip. The Detroit Pistons won the coin flip and were awarded the first overall pick, while the San Diego Rockets were awarded the second pick. The remaining first-round picks and the subsequent rounds were assigned to teams in reverse order of their win–loss record in the previous season. Three expansion franchises, the Buffalo Braves, the Cleveland Cavaliers and the Portland Trail Blazers, took part in the NBA Draft for the first time and were assigned the seventh, the eighth and the ninth pick in each round. In the first round, the Cavaliers had the seventh pick, while the Blazers and the Braves had the eighth and the ninth pick respectively. In the subsequent rounds, the Cavaliers and the Braves exchanged their order of selection, while the Blazers had the eighth pick throughout the draft. The draft consisted of 19 rounds comprising the selection of 239 players; it holds the record for the most prospects selected in any NBA draft.

Draft selections and draftee career notes
Bob Lanier from St. Bonaventure University was selected first overall by the Detroit Pistons. Rudy Tomjanovich from the University of Michigan and Pete Maravich from Louisiana State University were selected second and third respectively. Fourth pick Dave Cowens from Florida State University and eighth pick Geoff Petrie from Princeton University went on to be named as joint winners of the Rookie of the Year Award in their first season. Six players from this draft, Lanier, Maravich, Cowens, 18th pick Calvin Murphy, 19th pick Nate Archibald and 122nd pick Dan Issel, have been inducted to the Basketball Hall of Fame. Maravich, Cowens and Archibald were also named to the list of the  50 Greatest Players in NBA History announced at the league's 50th anniversary in 1996. Maravich had four All-NBA Team selections and five All-Star Game selections. Cowens won two NBA championships with the Boston Celtics in 1974 and 1976, one Most Valuable Player Award in 1973, and had three All-NBA Team selections and seven All-Star Game selections. Archibald won one NBA championship with the Celtics in 1981 and had five All-NBA Team selections and six All-Star Game selections. Lanier and Murphy were selected to eight and one All-Star Games respectively. Dan Issel initially opted to play in the American Basketball Association (ABA) with the Kentucky Colonels. He played six seasons in the ABA before finally joining the NBA with the Denver Nuggets when both leagues merged. He was selected to five All-ABA Teams, six ABA All-Star Games and one NBA All-Star Game.

Randy Smith, who was selected by the Detroit Pistons with the 205th pick, did not enter the league until the 1971–72 season, after he was drafted again in the 1971 Draft by the Buffalo Braves with the 104th pick. He was selected to both the All-NBA Team and the All-Star Game. Tomjanovich was selected to five All-Star Games during his career. Charlie Scott, the 106th pick, initially opted to play in the ABA with the Virginia Squires before joining the NBA in 1972. He was selected to two All-ABA Teams, two ABA All-Star Games and three NBA All-Star Games. Three other players from this draft, fifth pick Sam Lacey, seventh pick John Johnson and eighth pick Geoff Petrie, was also selected to at least one All-Star Game. The Rockets' first and second round picks, Tomjanovich and Murphy spent all of their playing career with the Rockets. Tomjanovich played 11 seasons while Murphy played 13 seasons with the Rockets.

Lanier, Tomjanovich, Cowens and Issel all became head coaches after ending their playing career. Lanier was the interim head coach of the Golden State Warriors in the 1995. Tomjanovich coached two NBA teams, the Houston Rockets and the Los Angeles Lakers. He coached the Rockets for 12 seasons, leading them to the NBA championship twice in 1994 and 1995. He also coached the United States national basketball team to a gold medal at the 2000 Olympic Games. Cowens started his coaching career as a player-coach with the Celtics during the 1978–79 season, before returning to a full-time player in the next season. He later coached two more NBA teams, most recently with the Golden State Warriors. Issel coached the Denver Nuggets for six seasons in two separate three-year stints. Two other players drafted also went on to have coaching careers in the NBA: 40th pick Gar Heard and 125th pick George Irvine.

The 1970 draft class is considered to be one of the best in NBA history as it produced six Hall of Famers and twelve All-Stars from those draftees who played in the NBA. Three of the first four picks were inducted to the Hall of Fame and seven of the first eight picks became All-Stars. The 1970 Draft is also known as the first draft where international players who had never played U.S. high school and college basketball were selected. In the 10th and 11th round, the Atlanta Hawks drafted Mexican Manuel Raga and Italian Dino Meneghin; both were playing in the Italian league at the time. They became the first two international players drafted to the NBA. However, neither of them ever played in the league as the Hawks did not have US$35,000 to buy out either of their contracts with their teams. Meneghin, who played 28 seasons in Italy, has been inducted by the International Basketball Federation (FIBA) to the FIBA Hall of Fame and also to the Basketball Hall of Fame. Raga has also been inducted into the FIBA Hall of Fame.

Key

Draft

Other picks
The following list includes other draft picks who have appeared in at least one NBA game.

Trades
 On February 2, 1970, the Atlanta Hawks acquired a first-round pick and future consideration (the Hawks acquired Clyde Lee on October 4, 1974) from the San Francisco Warriors in exchange for Zelmo Beaty. The Hawks used the pick to draft Pete Maravich.
 On the draft-day, the Baltimore Bullets acquired the Buffalo Braves' first-round pick from the Braves in exchange for Mike Davis and the Bullets' first-round pick. The Bullets used the pick to draft George E. Johnson while the Braves used the pick to draft John Hummer.
 On December 25, 1969, the Cincinnati Royals acquired a second-round pick from the San Francisco Warriors in exchange for Adrian Smith. The Royals used the pick to draft Nate Archibald.
 On November 1, 1969, the Seattle SuperSonics acquired a second-round pick from the Detroit Pistons in exchange for Erwin Mueller. The Sonics used the pick to select Jake Ford.
 On September 13, 1969, the Phoenix Suns acquired a second-round pick from the Philadelphia 76ers in exchange for Bill Melchionni. The Suns used the pick to draft Joe DePre.
 On February 1, 1970, the Detroit Pistons acquired Bob Quick and a second-round pick from the Bullets in exchange for Eddie Miles and a fourth-round pick. The Pistons used the pick to draft Ken Warzynski. The Bullets used the pick to select Bill Stricker.

Notable undrafted players
These players were not selected in the 1970 draft but played at least one game in the NBA.

References
General

Specific

External links
NBA.com
NBA.com: NBA Draft History

Draft
National Basketball Association draft
NBA draft
NBA draft
Basketball in New York City
Sporting events in New York City